This is a list of intercontinental ballistic missiles developed by various countries.

Russia
Specific types of Russian ICBMs include:

Active
R-36M2 Voevoda / SS-18 Satan
UR-100N 15A30 / SS-19 Stiletto
RT-2PM Topol / 15Zh58 / SS-25 Sickle
RT-2PM2 Topol-M / SS-27 / RS12M1 / RS12M2
RS-24 Yars: MIRV-equipped.
R-29R SS-N-18 Stingray
R-29RK SS-N-18 Stingray Mod 2
R-29RL MIRV-equipped/SS-N-18 Stingray Mod 3
R-29RM MIRV-equipped/SS-N-23 Skiff
R-29RMU Sineva MIRV-equipped/SS-N-23 Sineva mode 2
R-29RMU2 MIRV-equipped/SS-N-23 Liner
RSM-56 Bulava MIRV-equipped/SS-NX-30
RS-28 Sarmat / SS-X-30 Satan 2

Inactive
R-7 Semyorka / 8K71 / SS-6 Sapwood: The Sputnik variant of this rocket was first used to launch Sputnik 1 in October 1957. Derivatives are still in use today, primarily as the launcher for the Soyuz and the Progress spacecraft launches to the International Space Station.
R-16 SS-7 Saddler
R-9 Desna / SS-8 Sasin
R-36 SS-9 Scarp. Russia's first MIRVed missile
UR-100 8K84 / SS-11 Sego
RT-2 8K98 / SS-13 Savage
MR-UR-100 Sotka / 15A15/ SS-17 Spanker
RT-23 Molodets / SS-24 Scalpel
R-29 SS-N-8 Sawfly
R-39 Rif SS-N-20 Sturgeon

India
Surya missile: Intercontinental-ballistic missile, surface-based, solid and liquid propellant ballistic missile, 12,000–16,000 km (speculated) with MIRV capability.
Agni-VI: Road and Rail mobile ICBM, silo-based, 8,000–12,000 km with MIRVs
Agni-V: 2012, Road and Rail mobile ICBM, silo-based, 7,000–8,000 km.
K-5 SLBM: submarine launched, 5,000–5,500 km.
K-6 SLBM: submarine launched, 6,000–8,000 km with MIRVs

United States

Active
 Minuteman-III (LGM-30G): Only land-based ICBM in service in the United States.  The first MIRV (Multiple Independently Targetable Reentry Vehicle) missile.
 Trident II (UGM-133): Submarine-launched.

Inactive
 Atlas (SM-65, CGM-16): Former ICBM launched from silo, the rocket was modified and used in 1962-1963 for four crewed Mercury-Atlas flights, and was used, along with the Agena or Centaur upper stages, as a medium-lift satellite and interplanetary probe launcher for NASA and the USAF.  Original design, with "balloon tanks" and "1.5 staging," has since been retired and replaced with the Atlas V, which has an internal structure similar to the Titan ICBM, but using conventional propellants.
 Titan I (SM-68, HGM-25A): Based in underground launch complexes.  Used LOX/RP-1 propellants like Atlas, but stored in conventional tanks.
 Titan II (SM-68B, LGM-25C): Former hypergolic-fueled ICBM launched from silo, the rocket was used in 1965-1966 for ten crewed Gemini flights and its two-stage core was modified into the heavy-lifting Titan III and Titan IV rockets.  All Titan II, III, and IV models have since been retired.
 Minuteman I (SM-80, LGM-30A/B, HSM-80)
 Minuteman II (LGM-30F)
 LGM-118 Peacekeeper / MX (LGM-118A): silo-based, with rail basing tested; decommissioned in September 2005
 Midgetman: road mobile launcher; has never been operational, cancelled in 1992

In Development 
LGM-35 Sentinel, which is in development by Northrop Grumman in 2020, scheduled to be phased In starting 2027 to replace the Minuteman III.

China
DF (Dong Feng or East Wind) are land-based ICBMs.
 DF-5, DF-5A and DF-5B (CSS-4): silo based, 12,000-15,000 km, MIRV - 3 to 8
 DF-41 (CSS-X-10): 2017, road-mobile, maximum 12,000-15,000 km
JL-3 SLBM: 2018, submarine launched, 12,000 km
 JL-2 SLBM: 2005, submarine launched, 7,400-8,000 km
 DF-31 (CSS-9): 2006, road mobile, 7,250-8,000 km
 DF-4 (CSS-3): 1975, silo-based, 5,500 km
 DF-31B: 2015, road-mobile, unknown range and MIRV capability

France
France's proximity to Russia made only Intermediate-range ballistic missiles and Submarine-launched ballistic missiles necessary for strategic deterrence, while smaller warheads have been used as free-fall bombs and on airborne cruise missiles or short-range ballistic missiles (Pluton and Hadès).

Active
France now only deploys submarine-launched ballistic missiles, with all land based IRBMs decommissioned in September 1996. The French Air Force and French Navy retain aircraft-carried nuclear-tipped cruise missiles (ASMP-A) to fulfill the pre-strategic role (tactical-sized weapons used as "ultimate warning" before launching an all-out strategic strike). 
 M51 SLBM (three variants : M51.1 from 2010; M51.2 from 2015; M51.3 projected from 2025 onwards)

Inactive
 S2 IRBM
 S3 IRBM
 M4 SLBM
 M45 SLBM

Israel
Jericho III is a road mobile ICBM which entered service in 2008, a three-stage solid propellant missile with a payload of 1,000 to 1,300 kg with a range of 4,800 to 11,500 km (2,982 to 7,180 miles).  In November 2011, Israel successfully test fired an ICBM believed to be an upgraded version of the Jericho III.

North Korea
 Hwasong-17
 Hwasong-15
 Hwasong-14 is active
 Hwasong-13 (KN-08)

Intercontinental-range submarine-launched ballistic missiles

  The U.S. Navy currently has 18  submarines deployed, of which 14 are designated SSBNs and armed with 24  Trident II SLBMs each, for a total of 288 Trident II missiles equipped with 1,152 MIRV nuclear warheads.
  The Russian Navy currently has 14 SSBNs deployed, including 3 Delta III-class submarines, 6 Delta IV-class submarines, 1 Typhoon-class submarine and 4 Borei-class submarines.  Missiles include R-29R SLBMs, R-29RMU Sineva / R-29RMU2 Liner SLBMs with MIRV warheads and Bulava SLBMs with MIRV warheads.
  The United Kingdom's Royal Navy has four  SSBNs, each armed with 16 Trident II SLBMs with MIRV warheads for a total of 64 Trident II missiles and 225 nuclear warheads.
  The French Navy has four Triomphant-class SSBNs each armed with 16 M45s SLBMs with TN75 MIRV nuclear warheads. The M45 SLBMs are scheduled to be upgraded to M51.1 and M51.2 (expected to enter service in 2015).
  The People's Republic of China's People's Liberation Army Navy has five Type 094 SSBNs each to be armed with 12-16 JL-2 SLBMs.
 : It was revealed in 2011 that India is developing a submarine launch ballistic missiles based on some variants of the Agni series, the K Missile family which will be a series of submarine-launched solid fueled missiles. K-5 missile, with a maximum range of 6,000 to 8000 kilometers and a payload of one tonne, is under development by DRDO which may be the SLBM version of AGNI-VI (ICBM).

See also
 Intermediate-range ballistic missile(IRBM)
 Intercontinental ballistic missile
 Submarine-launched ballistic missile
 Comparison of ICBMs
 List of missiles
 List of orbital launch systems
 List of sounding rockets
 List of unguided rockets
 List of upper stages
 Comparison of lift launch systems
 Model rocket
 List of rocket planes
 List of weapons
 List of artillery#Rockets
 Expendable launch system
 NATO reporting name (has lists of various Soviet missiles)

References

ICBM